The Kleinlokomotiven (literally: small locomotives) of Class I were light German locomotives of low weight and power (up to 40 PS) designed for shunting duties. They were placed in service by the Deutsche Reichsbahn (DRG) after trials had been carried out on several prototype locomotives in 1930. The power source for these locomotives was either a diesel or petrol engine.

History 
After the Deutsche Reichsbahn had initially obtained several trials locomotives in 1930, it took delivery of production Kleinloks in 1931 and split them into two classes or 'power groups'. Locomotives in power group I, with an engine power of up to 40 PS (29 kW), were intended for shunting at small stations and in simple situations.

As a result of the new numbering scheme two of the trials engines from 1930 were also included in Class I. These were locomotives V 6016 and V 6017 (from 1931 Kö 0001 and Kö 0002) delivered by the Fürst-Stolberg-Hütte works at Ilsenburg. They did not acquit themselves well due to numerous defects and were retired again by 1932. Whilst, as early as 1931, the DRG had issued several specifications for locomotives in Class II, for Class I it simply ordered locomotives of the manufacturer's designs between 1931 and 1934, in order to keep procurement costs down. These locomotives were delivered by Jung, Orenstein & Koppel, Windhoff and Gmeinder. They were not permitted to leave the station, because they were too light to achieve reliable rail contact.

The Einheitskleinlokomotiven 
Once it had been demonstrated that the employment of low power Class I locomotives was economical, the project team developed 
a standard, small locomotive (Einheitskleinlokomotive) for the DRG. This was heavily based on the latest delivery from Gmeinder. As a result, the entire locomotive, apart from the diesel engine, was standardised. The footplate on the locomotives was open at the sides and all controls were duplicated on both sides of the engine. The Kleinlokomotiven had buffers and a very simple shunting coupling, that could be automatically coupled and then released using a foot pedal. Transmission was achieved from the engine using simple roller chains on both axles.

The locomotives only had a foot brake and no compressed air brake.

The first type of Einheitskleinlokomotive was further evolved in 1935 into a more robust and powerful model. This was given a much stronger frame and more powerful engine. Due to their greater weight these locomotives were allowed to range outside of stations. 

In order to be able to use home-produced fuels, from 1942 to 1945 many locomotives were converted and driven on liquefied petroleum gas (LPG). After the Second World War they were converted back again however to diesel operation.

Technical data

Post 1945 
The Deutsche Bundesbahn retired the manufacturer-designed Kleinlokomotiven and the 1934 standard class engines by 1963. They also standardised the rest of the Kleinloks between 1954 and 1962. As part of that, the locomotives were given the more powerful, air-cooled, 50 PS, Deutz F4L514 engines. As a result of this increase in power the numbering system was changed – from then on, locomotives with a power of up to 50 PS were allocated to Class I.

The Kleinlokomotiven in Class I were ousted by those in classes II and III. In addition the traffic in part-load goods fell, so that most of the engines were retired by the DB in the 1960s and 1970s.

In the Deutsche Reichsbahn there was an attempt to introduce a standard engine type, otherwise there were only minor modifications. In the 1970s they too retired most of the locomotives. Some of the retirements were officially called conversions; actually a new Class II locomotive was built by the Dessau shop (Reichsbahnausbesserungswerk or Raw).

Preserved 

Several of the engines have been preserved in their original design and are in use. For example:
 Kö 0049 at Schwarzenberg/Erzgeb. Railway Museum
 Kö 0128 of the AG Märkische Kleinbahn in Berlin
 Kö 0130 is displayed in Pyskowice Railway Museum in Pyskowice 
 Kö 0186 is displayed in the Art and Technology Gallery at Schorndorf.
 Kö 0281 as a V2 on the Hesper Valley Railway (Hespertalbahn)

See also 
Deutsche Reichsbahn
List of DRG locomotives and railbuses
Kleinlokomotive
DRG Kleinlokomotive Class II
DB Class Köf III

Sources

External links
 Axel Klatts Kleinlok website
 deutsche-kleinloks.de
 AG Märkische Kleinbahn

Diesel locomotives of Germany
Ko I
B locomotives
Railway locomotives introduced in 1930
Standard gauge locomotives of Germany
Shunting locomotives